Victor Berlinschi is a Moldovan politician who was a  member of the Parliament of Moldova.

External links
Cine au fost şi ce fac deputaţii primului Parlament din R. Moldova (1990-1994)?
Declaraţia deputaţilor din primul Parlament
Site-ul Parlamentului Republicii Moldova

Living people
Moldovan MPs 1990–1994
Place of birth missing (living people)
Popular Front of Moldova MPs
Year of birth missing (living people)